Outdoors with Geoff is a hunting/fishing television show it aired on Three in New Zealand. The programme premiered in 2003. Hosted by Geoff Thomas, Rheem New Zealand sponsored the programme.

Sources
1) http://www.tv3.co.nz/Shows/OutdoorsWithGeoff.aspx

2003 New Zealand television series debuts
2016 New Zealand television series endings
2000s New Zealand television series
2010s New Zealand television series
English-language television shows
Fishing in New Zealand
Fishing television series
Hunting in New Zealand
New Zealand sports television series
Three (TV channel) original programming